Mathspy is a 1988 BBC Maths Educational programme.

Episodes 
 Needle and Thread.
 More Waste, Less Speed.
 Play Your Cards.
 Solid Clues.
 To Make the Pattern Fit.
 1 Across, 1 Down.
 F2 to B4.
 Locks and Box.
 Seven Times Able.
 The Fourth Term.
 Final challenge.

Cast

Notes 

English-language television shows